The 2003 Qatar Total Open was a professional women's tennis tournament played on hard courts. It was the 3rd edition of the event and part of the WTA Tier III series of the 2003 WTA Tour. It took place at the International Tennis and Squash complex in Doha, Qatar between 10 and 16 February 2003.

Points and prize money

Point distribution

Prize money

* per team

Singles main-draw entrants

Seeds

   1 Rankings as of February 3, 2003.

Other entrants
The following players received wildcards into the singles main draw:
  Lina Krasnoroutskaya
  María Vento-Kabchi

The following players received entry from the qualifying draw:
  Lucie Ahl
  Arantxa Parra Santonja
  Sun Tiantian
  Zheng Jie

Retirements
  Conchita Martínez (left achilles)

Doubles main-draw entrants

Seeds

1 Rankings as of February 3, 2003.

Other entrants
The following pairs received wildcards into the doubles main draw:
  Gala León García /  Selima Sfar
  Anastasia Myskina /  Dinara Safina

The following pairs received entry from the qualifying draw:
  Yan Zi /  Zheng Jie

Finals

Singles

  Anastasia Myskina defeated  Elena Likhovtseva, 6–3, 6–1
It was the 1st title in the year for Myskina and the 3rd title in her career.

Doubles

  Janet Lee /  Wynne Prakusya defeated  María Vento-Kabchi /  Angelique Widjaja, 6–1, 6–3
It was the 3rd title for Lee and the 2nd title for Prakusya in their respective doubles careers.

References

External links
 Official Results Archive (ITF)
 Official Results Archive (WTA)

2003 WTA Tour
2003 Qatar Total Fina Elf Open
2003 in Qatari sport